Point Hope is a city in North Slope Borough, Alaska, United States. At the 2010 census the population was 674, down from 757 in 2000. In the 2020 Census, population rose to 830.

Like many isolated communities in Alaska, the city has no road or rail connections to the outside world, and must be accessed by sea or by air at Point Hope Airport.

History

Before any modern settlement, the Ipiutak lived here.

The descriptive Inuit name of the place, "Tikarakh" or "Tikiġaq", commonly spelled "Tiagara", means "forefinger". It was recorded as "Tiekagagmiut" in 1861 by P. Tikhmeniev Wich of the Russian Hydrographic Department and on Russian Chart 1495 it became "Tiekaga". This ancient village site was advantageous, because the protrusion of Point Hope into the sea brought the whales close to the shore.  At Tikigaq, they built semi-subterranean houses using mainly whalebone and driftwood.  Point Hope is one of the oldest continually occupied sites in North America.  While some of the earlier dwellings have been lost to erosion as the point shrinks, it still provides valuable information to archaeologists on how early Eskimos survived in their harsh environment.  The Tikigaq site is "by far the most extensive and complete one-period site yet discovered and described in the entire circumpolar region."  - Helge Larsen.

The first recorded Europeans to sight this cape were Russian explorers Mikhail Vasiliev and Gleb Shishmaryov of the Imperial Russian Navy on the ships Otkrietie and Blagonamierennie. Vasiliev and Shishmaryov named this landhead Mys Golovnina, after Vice Admiral Vasily Golovnin (1776–1831).

The cape at Point Hope was renamed by Captain Frederick William Beechey of the Royal Navy, who wrote on August 2, 1826: "I named it Point Hope in compliment to Sir William Johnstone Hope". According to Archdeacon Stuck Hope was from a "well-known house long connected with the sea".

Noel Wien made the first flight here in Aug. 1927.

Point Hope residents successfully opposed Project Chariot in 1962.

Geography
It is just above the arctic circle.

In December 2017, The New York Times profiled Point Hope, reporting that "a surprising, and bittersweet, side effect of global warming" would soon bring Point Hope "one of the fastest internet connections in America".

Demographics

Point Hope first appeared on the 1880 U.S. Census as the unincorporated Inuit settlement of "Tikirak." All of its 276 residents were Inuit. In 1890, it returned as Point Hope. Out of its 301 residents, 295 were Natives, 5 were White and 1 was "Other." It continued to return as Point Hope in 1900 and 1910. From 1920-40, it returned as the village of "Tigara" (with the alternative name of Point Hope). In 1950, it returned as Point Hope and has continued to do so to date. In 1966, it formally incorporated.

As of the 2010 United States Census, there were 674 people living in the city. The racial makeup of the city was 87.8% Native American, 5.8% White, 0.4% Black, 0.1% from some other race and 3.9% from two or more races. 1.9% were Hispanic or Latino of any race.

As of the census of 2000, there were 757 people, 186 households, and 151 families living in the city. The racial makeup of the city was 8.72% White, 0.13% Black or African American, 87.05% Native American, 0.13% Asian, 0.13% from other races, and 3.83% from two or more races.  1.72% of the population were Hispanic or Latino of any race.

There were 186 households, out of which 54.8% had children under the age of 18 living with them, 50.0% were married couples living together, 19.4% had a female householder with no husband present, and 18.3% were non-families. 13.4% of all households were made up of individuals, and 2.2% had someone living alone who was 65 years of age or older.  The average household size was 4.07 and the average family size was 4.50.

In the city, the age distribution of the population shows 42.5% under the age of 18, 11.6% from 18 to 24, 26.0% from 25 to 44, 14.7% from 45 to 64, and 5.2% who were 65 years of age or older.  The median age was 22 years. For every 100 females, there were 122.6 males.  For every 100 females age 18 and over, there were 118.6 males.

The median income for a household in the city was $63,125, and the median income for a family was $66,250. Males had a median income of $41,750 versus $35,625 for females. The per capita income for the city was $16,641.  About 13.9% of families and 14.8% of the population were below the poverty line, including 17.3% of those under age 18 and 16.2% of those age 65 or over.

Education
The North Slope Borough School District operates the Tikiġaq School in Point Hope.

Notable people
 John B. Driggs (1852–1914), physician who wrote Short Sketches of Oldest America (1905), a collection of stories and sketches of the Inupiat natives of Point Hope
 Caroline Cannon, awarded the Goldman Environmental Prize in 2012.  In addition to her environmental activism, Cannon has served on Point Hope's city council on and off for many years, including serving as mayor from 1998 to 2001

See also
 Point Hope (cape)

References

Chukchi Sea
Cities in Alaska
Cities in North Slope Borough, Alaska
Populated coastal places in Alaska on the Arctic Ocean
Populated places of the Arctic United States
Road-inaccessible communities of Alaska